Mara Leveritt is an American investigative reporter and author best known for examining the interaction of politics and criminal justice in certain serious crimes. Her book The Boys on the Tracks, about the unsolved murders of two teenage boys, has been called "a wrecking-ball tale of tragedy, malfeasance, and machine politics" and "one of the most important examples of investigative journalism in modern Arkansas history."

Devil's Knot, the case of teenagers known as the West Memphis Three who were convicted of murdering three young boys, was "a riveting portrait of a down-at-the-heels, socially conservative rural town with more than its share of corruption and violence" and "an indictment of a culture and legal system that failed to protect children as defendants or victims." Publishers Weekly called her book Dark Spell a "powerful look at how the wrong agenda can thoroughly undermine the justice system."

Awards 
Leveritt has been inducted into the Arkansas Writers' Hall of Fame and awarded Arkansas's Booker Worthen Literary Prize (twice), a Laman Writer's Fellowship, Arkansas's Porter Prize, and an honorary doctorate of humane letters from the University of Arkansas at Little Rock.

References

Living people
Writers from Arkansas
American non-fiction writers
American investigative journalists
Year of birth missing (living people)